The 1988 United States presidential election in the District of Columbia took place on November 8, 1988, as part of the 1988 United States presidential election. Voters chose three representatives, or electors, to the Electoral College, who voted for president and vice president.

Washington, D.C. overwhelmingly voted for Governor Michael Dukakis of Massachusetts, the Democratic candidate. Vice President George H. W. Bush received 14.3% of the vote. This is the most recent election in which the Republican candidate received more than 10% of the vote in the District of Columbia, and it was one of only two areas that leaned more Republican than in the presidential election of 1984, which had resulted in a Republican landslide, the other being Tennessee.

Results

See also
 United States presidential elections in the District of Columbia

References

District of Columbia
1988
United States president